is a video game and game editor for Nintendo 64. It was released only in Japan in 1998.

The game editor allows players to design their own shooting levels similar to those shown in Star Soldier: Vanishing Earth. The game has many options, such as creating the stage boss or adding a custom soundtrack for each level. It was originally developed alongside an ultimately unreleased accompanying expansion disk title for the 64DD.

It includes two sample games: "SOLID GEAR", and "USAGI-san" (Mr. Rabbit).

Reception

N64 Magazine  noted the difficulty of use in English "without any English instructions", but that "as Solid Gear ably demonstrates, Dezaemon is perfectly capable of producing a commercial-standard shooter", and that "given an English translation...we'd buy it just for the music editor." While IGN64 did not give it a full review, their coverage called it a "high quality creativity app"  and placed it second on their list of "Top Nintendo 64 Imports" after Sin & Punishment, lamenting that Nintendo did not give it a US release.

References

External links

Nintendo 64 games
Nintendo 64-only games
1998 video games
Athena (company) games
Japan-exclusive video games
Video games developed in Japan
Video game level editors